is a former Japanese football player.

Playing career
Hirata was born in Kanagawa Prefecture on September 9, 1969. After graduating from Sendai University, he joined JEF United Ichihara in 1992. On October 1, 1993, he debuted as substitute forward at the 84th minutes in J.League Cup against Gamba Osaka. However he could only play this match and retired at the end of the 1993 season.

Club statistics

References

External links

1969 births
Living people
Sendai University alumni
Association football people from Kanagawa Prefecture
Japanese footballers
J1 League players
JEF United Chiba players
Association football forwards